Guy Montserrat (24 June 1935 – 26 November 2014) was a French freestyle swimmer. He competed in two events at the 1956 Summer Olympics.

References

1935 births
2014 deaths
French male freestyle swimmers
Olympic swimmers of France
Swimmers at the 1956 Summer Olympics
Mediterranean Games medalists in swimming
Mediterranean Games gold medalists for France
Swimmers at the 1959 Mediterranean Games
European Aquatics Championships medalists in swimming
Swimmers at the 1955 Mediterranean Games